Cape Gloucester is a coastal locality in the Whitsunday Region, Queensland, Australia.

History
The locality is named after the cape, which was in turn named after William Henry, Duke of Gloucester and Edinburgh, on 4 June 1770 by Lieutenant James Cook of HMS Endeavour.

References 

Whitsunday Region
Coastline of Queensland
Localities in Queensland